Mohd. Johari bin Hussain is a Malaysian politician who served as Member of the Pahang State Executive Council in the Barisan Nasional (BN) state administrations under Menteris Besar Adnan Yaakob and Wan Rosdy Wan Ismail from May 2013 to November 2022. He has served as Member of the Pahang State Legislative Assembly (MLA) for Tioman since March 2008. He is a member of the United Malays National Organisation (UMNO), a component party of the BN coalition.

Election Results

Notes

References

Living people
People from Pahang
Malaysian people of Malay descent
Malaysian Muslims
United Malays National Organisation politicians
Members of the Pahang State Legislative Assembly
Pahang state executive councillors
21st-century Malaysian politicians
Year of birth missing (living people)